The Peugeot 1007 is a small three-door car manufactured by Peugeot from 2004 to 2009, noted for its user-swappable interior trim pieces and its four pillar design incorporating two power sliding doors. It shares its platform with the Peugeot 206, Citroën C2 and Citroën C3. Sales commenced in April 2005 in Europe.

Background
The 1007 is the production version of the Sésame concept, which was presented at the 2002 Paris Motor Show.

The car featured the optional "2-Tronic" automated manual transmission, also used (under the name "Sensodrive") on the Citroën's C2, C3 and C3 Pluriel which shares the 206's 1.4 L and 1.6 L petrol engines and 1.4 L and 1.6 L diesel engines.

For its size, the 1007 was expensive, with prices around €14,000 / £10,000. Euro NCAP awarded the vehicle its second best ever rating for adult occupant safety. It has been described as a supermini, an urban hatchback, a city car, and a small car, while some of the 1007's features have been compared to those of multi-purpose vehicles (MPVs). The vehicle was generally described as a petit monospace, minispace (small MPV) or microspace (smaller small MPV) by French press. Pininfarina, the studio that designed the 1007, described it as an MPV. Peugeot referred to the 1007 as a berline monocorps (one-box car).

Features
The 1007 is the first mainstream car from Peugeot to feature a "double zero" number. In English speaking countries, the name was marketed with the pronunciation "ten oh seven".

Originally launched with the pronunciation, "one double oh seven", and James Bond style promotion, Peugeot revised their strategy, under pressure from the Bond franchise owners. It is also commonly called the "one thousand and seven". In France, it was marketed as the "mille sept".

Discontinuation in Europe
The 1007 was dropped from Peugeot's model line up in the United Kingdom in 2008, although the car was still in production in mainland Europe until the end of 2009.

Reception 
Although the concept car received good reception from the public, once in production, the 1007 was regarded as one of Peugeot's largest sales failures. Overall, due to poor sales, Peugeot lost an estimated €15,380 per vehicle produced.

Engines

Sales

Gallery

See also
Toyota Porte, similar class car with sliding side doors

References

External links
Official international 1007 English website (discontinued)
Peugeot 1007 Handbook
Pininfarina Design

Cars introduced in 2005
Euro NCAP superminis
Front-wheel-drive vehicles
City cars
Hatchbacks
1007